Juan Arias de Villar (died 1501) was a Roman Catholic prelate who served as Bishop of Segovia (1498–1501)

Biography
In 1487, Juan Arias de Villar was selected by the King of Spain and confirmed by Pope Innocent VIII as Bishop of Oviedo (1487–1498). In 1498, he was appointed by Pope Alexander VI as Bishop of Segovia. He served as Bishop of Segovia until his death in 1501.

References

External links and additional sources
 (for Chronology of Bishops) 
 (for Chronology of Bishops) 
 (for Chronology of Bishops) 
 (for Chronology of Bishops) 

1501 deaths
16th-century Roman Catholic bishops in Spain
Bishops appointed by Pope Alexander VI
Bishops appointed by Pope Innocent VIII